Hunwick's Egg is a 2005 children's picture book by Mem Fox and illustrated by Pamela Lofts. It is about a bilby who finds an egg and after taking care of it comes to realise that is actually a rock, but continues to look after it just the same.

Reception
Hunwick's Egg received mixed reviews with Kirkus Reviews calling it "a rare miss", and Publishers Weekly said that "despite the lovely vistas, the ending here may well be a letdown to readers".

Booklist was somewhat critical: "The abrupt conclusion is puzzling, and the layouts, featuring small inset scenes surrounded by creatures and plants set against white backgrounds, don't always make the most of Lofts' striking, detailed, colored-pencil art". The review concluded: "But children will easily be drawn to Lofts' astonishingly expressive animal characters, and Fox's gentle text may resonate with young ones who feel a magical connection or companionship with their own cherished rock, shell, or shred of blanket".

Hunwick's Egg has also been reviewed by the School Library Journal, Horn Book Guides, Library Media Connection, Bookseller+Publisher Review, and Magpies.

References

External links
 Library holdings of Hunwick's Egg

Australian picture books
2005 children's books
Picture books by Mem Fox
Fictional marsupials